Yeremey Iudovich Parnov (20 October 1935 – 18 March 2009 ) was a Soviet and Jewish Russian writer and publicist. Parnov attended the Moscow Peat University and worked as a chemical engineer. He also used to work as a professional journalist. Parnov is an author of several popular scientific works such as Фантастика в век НТР or Зеркало Урании (Science fiction in the age of scientific and technological revolution or Mirror of Urania), as well as dozens of articles, sketches and essays.

Strikingly foreshadowing concerns of later decades, in 1964 he collaborated with Mikhail Yemtsev to write the Soviet novel World Soul, (translated into English by Antonina W. Bouis). The authors write about a supercomputer which uploads all human identities and downloads them in a global nightmare of scrambled individuality. After several years of co-authorship with Yemtsev, this ceased in 1970. He died in 2009.

Works
Screenplays
 The Casket of Maria Medici

Collaborative works with  M. Yemtsev
Collected stories
Uravneniye s Blednogo Neptuna; English translation: The Pale Neptune Equation
Padeniye sverkhnovoy
Posledneye puteshestviye polkovnika Fosetta
Zelyonaya krevetka
Tri kvarka
Yarmarka teney
Novels
Dusha Mira; English translation: World Soul
More Diraka
Klochya tmy na igle vremeni

References

External links

1935 births
2009 deaths
Russian science fiction writers
Russian male essayists
Soviet science fiction writers
Soviet male writers
20th-century Russian male writers
Engineers from Kharkiv
20th-century essayists
20th-century Russian journalists
Writers from Kharkiv